General of the Army Josef Bečvář (born 11 August 1958) is a retired Czech army officer who served as the Chief of the General Staff of the Military of the Czech Republic from 2015 to 2018.

References

External links

 Chief of the General Staff of Armed Forces of the Czech Republic

Living people
Czech generals
Charles University alumni
1958 births
People from Plzeň
Chiefs of the General Staff (Czech Republic)